Soupy may refer to:

Personal nickname
 Andrew Campbell (ice hockey) (born 1988), Canadian hockey player
 Dan Campbell (singer), lead singer of the American rock band The Wonder Years
 Jerry Campbell (1944–2017), American-Canadian football player
 Jack Shapiro (1907–2001), American football player, the shortest in National Football League history

Arts and entertainment
 Soupy Sales, stage name of American comedian and actor Milton Supman (1926–2009)
 the title character of Soupy Norman, an Irish-Polish television programme broadcast by RTÉ from 2007 to 2008
 Jimmy "Soupy" Campbell, a minor character in Sister, Sister, a 1990s American sitcom
 "Soupy", a 1965 song by Maggie Thrett

Lists of people by nickname